Ronald Reagan High School may refer to several high schools in the United States:

 Ronald Reagan High School (San Antonio), San Antonio, Texas
 Ronald W. Reagan/Doral Senior High School, Doral, Florida
 Ronald W. Reagan High School, Pfafftown, North Carolina
 Ronald W. Reagan IB High School, New Berlin, Wisconsin
 Ronald Wilson Reagan College Preparatory High School, Milwaukee, Wisconsin

See also
Reagan High School (disambiguation)